Moses Hampton Todd (August 31, 1845 – November 7, 1935) was a Pennsylvania lawyer, who served as state Attorney General.

Biography and career
Todd was born in 1845, son of James Todd, a well-known Philadelphia lawyer and former state legislator and Attorney General, and his second wife, Jane Miller.  In 1852, the elder Todd retired and the family moved to Greenberg. Upon the elder Todd's death in 1863, the family moved to Uniontown.

Todd attended Washington & Jefferson College for three years, then read law and was admitted to the bar of Fayette County in 1868.  He was then admitted to the bar of Philadelphia in 1869, and assisted Theodore Cuyler there. Todd opened his own offices in Philadelphia in 1875.

Todd married Alice Euphemia Feree (1846–1930) in 1870. They had 4 children.

Todd was appointed as state Attorney General in 1907, and served until 1911. In his first year, he was the "dominant figure in the prosecution in the capitol graft case".

Todd is buried at Section W, Lots 23 & 25 of Laurel Hill Cemetery in Philadelphia.

References

1845 births
1935 deaths
Pennsylvania lawyers
Pennsylvania Attorneys General
Washington & Jefferson College alumni